General elections were held in Malta on 24 January 1860.

Background
The elections were held under the 1849 constitution, which provided for an 18-member Government Council, of which ten members would be appointed and eight elected.

Results
A total of 3,343 people were registered to vote, of which 3,044 cast votes, giving a turnout of 91%.

References

General elections in Malta
Malta
1860 in Malta
January 1860 events